USS Sarpedon (ARB-7) was laid down as a United States Navy  but was converted as one of twelve Aristaeus-class battle damage repair ships built for the Navy during World War II. Named for Sarpedon (in Greek mythology, a Lycian King, and a son of Zeus and Laodamia), and also she was the only US Naval vessel to bear the name.

Construction
Sarpedon was laid down as LST-956 on 11 July 1944, at Hingham, Massachusetts, by the Bethlehem-Hingham Shipyard; reclassified as a battle damage repair ship and named Sarpedon on 14 August 1944; launched on 21 August 1944; commissioned on 16 November 1944, for transit to the conversion yard; decommissioned on 29 November 1944, for conversion by the Maryland Drydock Company, of Baltimore, Maryland; and recommissioned on 19 March 1945.

Service history
After shakedown, Sarpedon sailed from Norfolk, Virginia for the Pacific. Following brief stops at the Panama Canal Zone, San Pedro, Los Angeles, Pearl Harbor, Eniwetok, and Guam, Sarpedon arrived at Saipan on 2 July 1945. While awaiting further routing there, she began functioning as a repair ship, doing numerous jobs on equipment brought to her shops from other ships. She sailed for Okinawa on 1 August, and upon arrival at Naval Base Okinawa on 7 August, began work repairing the damage caused to ships there by heavy enemy air attacks and long continuous operations.

The Japanese surrendered on 15 August, but Sarpedon, plagued by a new enemy, the weather, continued to work in support of occupation forces. After riding out Typhoon Ida at anchor on 16 September, she went to sea to avoid the Typhoon Jean of 29 September, but was ordered to remain in port when a third, Typhoon Louise struck on 8 and 9 October. Many craft were wrecked in the harbor, but Sarpedons anchor held despite collisions with two barges and a PC which broke their moorings and crashed alongside. Later moving to Shanghai, China, Sarpedon continued to provide repair support to ships engaged in occupation duties until sailing from Shanghai, on 20 March 1946, for Bikini. However, her participation in the atomic bomb tests there was cancelled. After remaining at Kwajalein from 5 April to 8 May, she arrived at San Pedro, Los Angeles, on 28 May 1946, for inactivation. Sarpedon was decommissioned on 29 January 1947, and placed in reserve at San Diego.

Laid up in the Pacific Reserve Fleet, San Diego Group, she was struck from the Naval Vessel Register 15 April 1976; sold for scrapping 1 January 1977, by the Defense Reutilization and Marketing Service (DRMS); and acquired by Phaethon Shipping & Trading Corporation S.A., Panama, and renamed SS Petrola 133. The ship was broken up for scrap 30 May 1989.

Notes

Citations

Bibliography 

Online resources

External links
 

 

Aristaeus-class repair ships
Aristaeus-class repair ships converted from LST-542-class ships
Ships built in Hingham, Massachusetts
1944 ships
World War II auxiliary ships of the United States
Pacific Reserve Fleet, San Diego